Sauzet is a commune in the Lot department in south-western France.

Geography
The Séoune has its source in the commune and forms part of its south-western border.

See also
Communes of the Lot department

References

Communes of Lot (department)